Recreational drug use is the use of one or more psychoactive drugs to induce an altered state of consciousness either for pleasure or for some other casual purpose or pastime. When a psychoactive drug enters the user's body, it induces an intoxicating effect. Generally, recreational drugs are divided into three categories: depressants (drugs that induce a feeling of relaxation and calmness), stimulants (drugs that induce a sense of energy and alertness), and hallucinogens (drugs that induce perceptual distortions such as hallucination).

In popular practice, recreational drug use generally is a tolerated social behaviour, rather than perceived as the medical condition of self-medication. However, drug use and drug addiction are severely stigmatized everywhere in the world. Many people also use prescribed and controlled depressants such as opioids, as well as opiates and benzodiazepines. What controlled substances are considered generally unlawful to possess varies by country, but usually includes cannabis, cocaine, opioids, MDMA, amphetamine, methamphetamine, psychedelics, benzodiazepines, and barbiturates.  it is estimated that about 5% of people worldwide aged 15 to 65 (158 million to 351 million) had used controlled drugs at least once.

Common recreational drugs include caffeine, commonly found in coffee, tea, soft drinks, and chocolate; alcohol, commonly found in beer, wine, and distilled spirits; nicotine, commonly found in tobacco, tobacco-based products, and electronic cigarettes; cannabis and hashish (with legality of possession varying inter/intra-nationally); and the controlled substances listed as controlled drugs in the Single Convention on Narcotic Drugs (1961) and the Convention on Psychotropic Substances (1971) of the United Nations (UN). Since the early 2000s, the European Union (EU) has developed several comprehensive and multidisciplinary strategies as part of its drug policy in order to prevent drug use and raise public awareness on the adverse effects of drugs among all member states of the European Union, as well as conjoined efforts with the Europol and EMCDDA to counter organized crime and illegal drug trade in Europe.

Reasons for use

Many researchers have explored the etiology of recreational drug use. Some of the most common theories are: genetics, personality type, psychological problems, self-medication, sex, age, depression, curiosity, boredom, rebelliousness, a sense of belonging to a group, family and attachment issues, history of trauma, failure at school or work, socioeconomic stressors, peer pressure, juvenile delinquency, availability, historical factors, or socio-cultural influences. There has been no consensus on a single cause. Instead, experts tend to apply the biopsychosocial model. Any number of factors may influence an individual's drug use as they are not mutually exclusive. Regardless of genetics, mental health, or traumatic experiences, social factors play a large role in exposure to and availability of certain types of drugs and patterns of use.

According to addiction researcher Martin A. Plant, some people go through a period of self-redefinition before initiating recreational drug use. They tend to view using drugs as part of a general lifestyle that involves belonging to a subculture that they associate with heightened status and the challenging of social norms. Plant states: "From the user's point of view there are many positive reasons to become part of the milieu of drug taking. The reasons for drug use appear to have as much to do with needs for friendship, pleasure and status as they do with unhappiness or poverty. Becoming a drug taker, to many people, is a positive affirmation rather than a negative experience".

Evolution

Anthropological research has suggested that humans "may have evolved to counter-exploit plant neurotoxins". The ability to use botanical chemicals to serve the function of endogenous neurotransmitters may have improved survival rates, conferring an evolutionary advantage. A typically restrictive prehistoric diet may have emphasized the apparent benefit of consuming psychoactive drugs, which had themselves evolved to imitate neurotransmitters. Chemical–ecological adaptations, and the genetics of hepatic enzymes, particularly cytochrome P450, have led researchers to propose that "humans have shared a co-evolutionary relationship with psychotropic plant substances that is millions of years old."

Health risks

Severity of impact and type of risks that come with recreational drug use vary widely with the drug in question and the amount being used. There are many factors in the environment and within the user that interact with each drug differently. Alcohol is sometimes considered one of the most dangerous recreational drugs. Alcoholic drinks, tobacco products and other nicotine-based products (e.g., electronic cigarettes), and cannabis are regarded by various medical professionals to be the most common and widespread gateway drugs. In the United States, Australia, and New Zealand, the general onset of drinking alcohol, tobacco smoking, cannabis smoking, and consumption of multiple drugs most frequently occurs during adolescence and in middle school and secondary school settings.

Some scientific studies in the early 21st century found that a low to moderate level of alcohol consumption, particularly of red wine, might have substantial health benefits such as decreased risk of cardiovascular diseases, stroke, and cognitive decline. This claim has been disputed, specifically by researcher David Nutt who said that studies showing benefits for "moderate" alcohol consumption lacked controls for the variable of what the subjects were drinking beforehand. Experts in the United Kingdom have suggested that some psychoactive drugs that may be causing less harm to fewer users (although they are also used less frequently in the first place) are cannabis, psilocybin mushrooms, LSD, and MDMA; however, these drugs have risks and side effects of their own.

Drug harmfulness

Drug harmfulness is defined as the degree to which a psychoactive drug has the potential to cause harm to the user and is measured in several ways, such as by addictiveness and potential for physical harm. More objectively harmful drugs may be colloquially referred to as "hard drugs", and less harmful drugs as "soft drugs". The term "soft drug" is considered controversial by critics as it may imply the false belief that soft drugs cause lesser or insignificant harm.

Responsible use

Responsible drug use advocates that users should not take drugs at the same time as activities such as driving, swimming, operating machinery, or other activities that are unsafe without a sober state. Responsible drug use is emphasized as a primary prevention technique in harm-reduction drug policies. Harm-reduction policies were popularized in the late 1980s, although they began in the 1970s counter-culture, through cartoons explaining responsible drug use and the consequences of irresponsible drug to users. Another issue is that the illegality of drugs causes social and economic consequences for users—the drugs may be "cut" with adulterants and the purity varies wildly, making overdoses more likely—and legalization of drug production and distribution could reduce these and other dangers of illegal drug use.

Prevention

In efforts to curtail recreational drug use, governments worldwide introduced several laws prohibiting the possession of almost all varieties of recreational drugs during the 20th century. The West's "War on Drugs" however, is now facing increasing criticism. Evidence is insufficient to tell if behavioral interventions help prevent recreational drug use in children.

One in four adolescents has used an illegal drug and one in ten of those adolescents who need addiction treatment get some type of care. School-based programs are the most commonly used method for drug use education; however, the success rates of these intervention programs is highly dependent on the commitment of participants, and is limited in general.

Demographics

Australia

Alcohol is the most widely used drug in Australia. 86.2% of Australians aged 12 years and over have consumed alcohol at least once in their lifetime, compared to 34.8% of Australians aged 12 years and over who have used cannabis at least once in their lifetime.

United States

From the mid-19th century to the 1930s, American physicians prescribed Cannabis sativa as a prescription drug for various medical conditions. In the 1960s, the counterculture movement introduced the use of psychoactive drugs, including cannabis. Young adults and college students reported the recreational prevalence of cannabis, among other drugs, at 20-25% while the cultural mindset of using was open and curious. In 1969, the FBI reported that between the years 1966 and 1968, the number of arrests for marijuana possession, which had been outlawed throughout the United States under Marijuana Tax Act of 1937, had increased by 98%. Despite acknowledgement that drug use was greatly growing among America's youth during the late 1960s, surveys have suggested that only as much as 4% of the American population had ever smoked marijuana by 1969. By 1972, however, that number would increase to 12%. That number would then double by 1977.

The Controlled Substances Act of 1970 classified marijuana along with heroin and LSD as a Schedule I drug, i.e., having the relatively highest abuse potential and no accepted medical use. Most marijuana at that time came from Mexico, but in 1975 the Mexican government agreed to eradicate the crop by spraying it with the herbicide paraquat, raising fears of toxic side effects. Colombia then became the main supplier. The "zero tolerance" climate of the Reagan and Bush administrations (1981–93) resulted in passage of strict laws and mandatory sentences for possession of marijuana. The "War on Drugs" thus brought with it a shift from reliance on imported supplies to domestic cultivation (particularly in Hawaii and California). Beginning in 1982, the Drug Enforcement Administration turned increased attention to marijuana farms in the United States, and there was a shift to the indoor growing of plants specially developed for small size and high yield. After over a decade of decreasing use, marijuana smoking began an upward trend once more in the early 1990s, especially among teenagers, but by the end of the decade this upswing had leveled off well below former peaks of use.

Society and culture

Many movements and organizations are advocating for or against the liberalization of the use of recreational drugs, most notably regarding the legalization of marijuana and cannabinoids for medical and/or recreational use. Subcultures have emerged among users of recreational drugs, as well as alternative lifestyles and social movements among those who abstain from them, such as teetotalism and "straight edge".

Since the early 2000s, medical professionals have acknowledged and addressed the problem of the increasing consumption of alcoholic drinks and club drugs (such as MDMA, cocaine, rohypnol, GHB, ketamine, PCP, LSD, and methamphetamine) associated with rave culture among adolescents and young adults in the Western world. Studies have shown that adolescents are more likely than young adults to use multiple drugs, and the consumption of club drugs is highly associated with the presence of criminal behaviors and recent alcohol abuse or dependence.

The prevalence of recreational drugs in human societies is widely reflected in fiction, entertainment, and the arts, subject to prevailing laws and social conventions. For instance, in the music industry, the musical genres hip hop, hardcore rap, and trap, alongside their derivative subgenres and subcultures, are most notorious for having continuously celebrated and promoted drug trafficking, gangster lifestyle, and consumption of alcohol and other drugs since their inception in the United States during the late 1980s–early 1990s. In video games, for example, drugs are portrayed in a variety of ways: including power-ups (cocaine gum replenishes stamina in Red Dead Redemption 2), obstacles to be avoided (such as the Fuzzies in Super Mario World 2: Yoshi's Island that distort the player's view when accidentally consumed), items to be bought and sold for in-game currency (coke dealing is a big part of Scarface: The World Is Yours). In 1997's Fallout, drugs ("chems" in the game) can fill the role of any above mentioned. Drug trafficking, gang rivalries, and their related criminal underworld also play a big part in the best-selling Grand Theft Auto video game franchise.

Common recreational drugs
The following substances are commonly used recreationally:
 Alcohol: Most drinking alcohol is ethanol, . Drinking alcohol creates intoxication, relaxation and lowered inhibitions. It is produced by the fermentation of sugars by yeasts to create wine, beer, and distilled liquor (e.g., vodka, rum, gin, etc.). In most areas of the world, it is legal for those over a certain age (18 in most countries). It is an IARC Group 1 carcinogen and a teratogen. Alcohol withdrawal can be life-threatening.
 Amphetamines: Used recreationally to provide alertness and a sense of energy. Prescribed for ADHD, narcolepsy, depression and weight loss. A potent central nervous system stimulant, in the 1940s and 50s methamphetamine was used by Axis and Allied troops in World War II, and, later on, other armies, and by Japanese factory workers. It increases muscle strength and fatigue resistance and improves reaction time. Methamphetamine use can be neurotoxic, which means it damages dopamine neurons. As a result of this brain damage, chronic use can lead to post acute withdrawal syndrome.
 Caffeine: Often found in coffee, black tea, energy drinks, some soft drinks (e.g., Coca-Cola, Pepsi and Mountain Dew, among others), and chocolate. It is the world's most widely consumed psychoactive drug, but has only mild dependence liability for long-term users.
 Cannabis: Its common forms include marijuana and hashish, which are smoked, vaporized or eaten. It contains at least 85 cannabinoids. The primary psychoactive component is THC, which mimics the neurotransmitter anandamide, named after the Hindu ananda, "joy, bliss, delight". When cannabis is eaten, THC metabolized into 11-OH-THC, this molecule is the primary psychoactive coumpound of edible forms of cannabis. THC and 11-OH-THC are partial agonist at CB1 and CB2 receptors of the endocannabinoid system. 
 Cocaine: It is available as a white powder, which is insufflated ("sniffed" into the nostrils) or converted into a solution with water and injected. A popular derivative, crack cocaine is typically smoked. When transformed into its freebase form, crack, the cocaine vapour may be inhaled directly. This is thought to increase bioavailability, but has also been found to be toxic, due to the production of methylecgonidine during pyrolysis.
 MDMA: Commonly known as ecstasy, it is a common club drug in the rave scene.
 Electronic cigarette: A large proportion of e-cigarette use is recreational. Most e-cigarette liquids contain nicotine, but the level of nicotine varies depending on user-preference and manufacturers. Nicotine is highly addictive, comparable to heroin or cocaine. E-cigarettes are being used to inhale MDMA, cocaine powder, crack cocaine, synthetic cathinones, mephedrone, α-PVP, synthetic cannabinoids, opioids, heroin, fentanyl, tryptamines, and ketamine.
 Ketamine: An anesthetic used legally by paramedics and doctors in emergency situations for its dissociative and analgesic qualities and illegally in the club drug scene.
 Lean: A liquid drug mixture made when mixing cough syrup, sweets, soft drinks and codeine. It originated in the 1990s in Houston. Ever since then, this drug usage has grown and is often used at parties and in the trap music scene. Many people would get a drowsy feeling when consuming this drug.
 LSD: A popular ergoline derivative, that was first synthesized in 1938 by Albert Hofmann. However, he failed to notice its psychedelic effects until 1943. It's a serotonergic psychedelic (partial agonist at serotonin receptors, particularly the 5-HT2A subtypes) like psilocin, mescaline and DMT. But LSD is unique because it is also a partial agonist of dopamine and norepinephrine receptors, particularly the D2R subtypes. LSD (d-Lysergic Acid Diethylamide) is a molecule of the lysergamide family, a subclass of the tryptamine family. In the 1950s, it was used in psychological therapy, and, covertly, by the CIA in Project MKULTRA, in which the drug was administered to unwitting US and Canadian citizens. It played a central role in 1960s 'counter-culture', and was banned in October 1968 by US President Lyndon B Johnson.
 Nitrous oxide: legally used by dentists as an anxiolytic and anaesthetic, it is also used recreationally by users who obtain it from whipped cream canisters (whippets or whip-its) (see inhalant), as it causes perceptual effects, a "high" and at higher doses, hallucinations.
 Opiates and opioids: Available by prescription for pain relief. Commonly used opioids include oxycodone, hydrocodone, codeine, fentanyl, heroin, methadone, and morphine. Opioids have a high potential for addiction and have the ability to induce severe physical withdrawal symptoms upon cessation of frequent use. Heroin can be smoked, insufflated or turned into a solution with water and injected. Percocet is a prescription opioid containing oxycodone and acetaminophen. 
 Psilocybin mushrooms: This hallucinogenic drug was an important drug in the psychedelic scene. Until 1963, when it was chemically analysed by Albert Hofmann, it was completely unknown to modern science that Psilocybe semilanceata ("Liberty Cap", common throughout Europe) contains psilocybin, a hallucinogen previously identified only in species native to Mexico, Asia, and North America.
 Tobacco: Nicotiana tabacum. Nicotine is the key drug contained in tobacco leaves, which are either smoked, chewed or snuffed. It contains nicotine, which crosses the blood–brain barrier in 10–20 seconds. It mimics the action of the neurotransmitter acetylcholine at nicotinic acetylcholine receptors in the brain and the neuromuscular junction. The neuronal forms of the receptor are present both post-synaptically (involved in classical neurotransmission) and pre-synaptically, where they can influence the release of multiple neurotransmitters.
 Tranquilizers: barbiturates, benzodiazepines (e.g. alprazolam, diazepam, etc.)(commonly prescribed for anxiety disorders; known to cause dementia and post acute withdrawal syndrome)
 "Bath salts": slang term that generally refers to substituted cathinones such as Mephedrone and Methylenedioxypyrovalerone (MDPV), but not always
 DMT – primary ingredient in ayahuasca, can also be smoked (inhalation causes a brief effect lasting usually 5 to 15 minutes).
 Peyote: This hallucinogen contains mescaline, native to southwestern Texas and Mexico. Echinopsis pachanoi is a faster growing cactus containing mescaline.
 Salvia divinorum: This hallucinogenic Mexican herb in the mint family; not considered recreational, most likely due to the nature of the hallucinations (legal in some jurisdictions)
 Synthetic cannabis: "Spice", "K2", JWH-018, AM-2201
 Quaaludes: A popular club drug in the 1970s. No longer prescribed or manufactured in many countries but remains popular in South Africa.

Routes of administration 

Drugs are often associated with a particular route of administration. Many drugs can be consumed in more than one way. For example, marijuana can be swallowed like food or smoked, and cocaine can be "sniffed" in the nostrils, injected, or, with various modifications, smoked.

 inhalation: all intoxicative inhalants (see below) that are gases or solvent vapours that are inhaled through the trachea, as the name suggests
 insufflation: also known as "snorting", or "sniffing", this method involves the user placing a powder in the nostrils and breathing in through the nose, so that the drug is absorbed by the mucous membranes. Drugs that are "snorted", or "sniffed", include powdered amphetamines, cocaine, heroin, ketamine, MDMA, snuff tobacco
 Subcutaneous injection: also known as Skin popping. Injection of drug into the third lowest layer of skin.
 Intramuscular injection: injection of drug into a muscle.
 intravenous injection (see also the article Drug injection): the user injects a solution of water and the drug into a vein, or less commonly, into the tissue. Drugs that are injected include morphine and heroin, less commonly other opioids. Stimulants like cocaine or methamphetamine may also be injected. In rare cases, users inject other drugs.
 oral intake: caffeine, ethanol, cannabis edibles, psilocybin mushrooms, coca tea, poppy tea, laudanum, GHB, ecstasy pills with MDMA or various other substances (mainly stimulants and psychedelics), prescription and over-the-counter drugs (ADHD and narcolepsy medications, benzodiazepines, anxiolytics, sedatives, cough suppressants, morphine, codeine, opioids and others)
 sublingual: substances diffuse into the blood through tissues under the tongue.  Many psychoactive drugs can be or have been specifically designed for sublingual administration, including barbiturates, benzodiazepines, opioid analgesics with poor gastrointestinal bioavailability, LSD blotters, coca leaves, some hallucinogens. This route of administration is activated when chewing some forms of smokeless tobacco (e.g. dipping tobacco, snus).
 intrarectal: administering into the rectum, most water-soluble drugs can be used this way.
 smoking (see also the section below): tobacco, cannabis, opium, crystal meth, phencyclidine, crack cocaine and heroin (diamorphine as freebase) known as chasing the dragon.
 transdermal patches with prescription drugs: e.g. methylphenidate (Daytrana) and fentanyl.

Many drugs are taken through various routes. Intravenous route is the most efficient, but also one of the most dangerous. Nasal, rectal, inhalation and smoking are safer. The oral route is one of the safest and most comfortable, but of little bioavailability.

Types

Depressants

Depressants are psychoactive drugs that temporarily diminish the function or activity of a specific part of the body or mind. Colloquially, depressants are known as "downers", and users generally take them to feel more relaxed and less tense. Examples of these kinds of effects may include anxiolysis, sedation, and hypotension. Depressants are widely used throughout the world as prescription medicines and as illicit substances. When these are used, effects may include anxiolysis (reduction of anxiety), analgesia (pain relief), sedation, somnolence, cognitive/memory impairment, dissociation, muscle relaxation, lowered blood pressure/heart rate, respiratory depression, anesthesia, and anticonvulsant effects.  Depressants exert their effects through a number of different pharmacological mechanisms, the most prominent of which include potentiation of GABA or opioid activity, and inhibition of adrenergic, histamine or acetylcholine activity. Some are also capable of inducing feelings of euphoria. The most widely used depressant by far is alcohol (i.e. ethanol).

Stimulants or "uppers", such as amphetamines or cocaine, which increase mental or physical function, have an opposite effect to depressants.

Depressants, in particular alcohol, can precipitate psychosis. A 2019 systematic review and meta-analysis by Murrie et al. found that the rate of transition from opioid, alcohol and sedative induced psychosis to schizophrenia was 12%, 10% and 9% respectively.

Antihistamines

Antihistamines (or "histamine antagonists") inhibit the release or action of histamine. "Antihistamine" can be used to describe any histamine antagonist, but the term is usually reserved for the classical antihistamines that act upon the H1 histamine receptor. Antihistamines are used as treatment for allergies. Allergies are caused by an excessive response of the body to allergens, such as the pollen released by grasses and trees. An allergic reaction causes release of histamine by the body. Other uses of antihistamines are to help with normal symptoms of insect stings even if there is no allergic reaction. Their recreational appeal exists mainly due to their anticholinergic properties, that induce anxiolysis and, in some cases such as diphenhydramine, chlorpheniramine, and orphenadrine, a characteristic euphoria at moderate doses. High dosages taken to induce recreational drug effects may lead to overdoses. Antihistamines are also consumed in combination with alcohol, particularly by youth who find it hard to obtain alcohol. The combination of the two drugs can cause intoxication with lower alcohol doses.

Hallucinations and possibly delirium resembling the effects of Datura stramonium can result if the drug is taken in much higher than therapeutic doses. Antihistamines are widely available over the counter at drug stores (without a prescription), in the form of allergy medication and some cough medicines. They are sometimes used in combination with other substances such as alcohol.
The most common unsupervised use of antihistamines in terms of volume and percentage of the total is perhaps in parallel to the medicinal use of some antihistamines to extend and intensify the effects of opioids and depressants. The most commonly used are hydroxyzine, mainly to extend a supply of other drugs, as in medical use, and the above-mentioned ethanolamine and alkylamine-class first-generation antihistamines, which are – once again as in the 1950s – the subject of medical research into their anti-depressant properties.

For all of the above reasons, the use of medicinal scopolamine for recreational uses is also observed.

Analgesics

Analgesics (also known as "painkillers") are used to relieve pain (achieve analgesia). The word analgesic derives from Greek "αν-" (an-, "without") and "άλγος" (álgos, "pain"). Analgesic drugs act in various ways on the peripheral and central nervous systems; they include paracetamol (also known in the US as acetaminophen), the nonsteroidal anti-inflammatory drugs (NSAIDs) such as the salicylates (e.g. aspirin), and opioid drugs such as hydrocodone, codeine, heroin and oxycodone. Some further examples of the brand name prescription opiates and opioid analgesics that may be used recreationally include Vicodin, Lortab, Norco (hydrocodone), Avinza, Kapanol (morphine), Opana, Paramorphan (oxymorphone), Dilaudid, Palladone (hydromorphone), and OxyContin (oxycodone).

Tranquilizers

The following are examples of tranquilizers (GABAergics):
 Barbiturates
 Benzodiazepines
 Ethanol (drinking alcohol; ethyl alcohol)
 Nonbenzodiazepines
 Others
 carisoprodol (Soma)
 chloral hydrate
 diethyl ether
 ethchlorvynol (Placidyl; "jelly-bellies")
 gamma-butyrolactone (GBL, a prodrug to GHB)
 gamma-hydroxybutyrate (GHB; G; Xyrem; "Liquid Ecstasy", "Fantasy")
 glutethimide (Doriden)
 kava (from Piper methysticum; contains kavalactones)
 ketamine, a phencyclidine (PCP) analog
 meprobamate (Miltown)
 methaqualone (Sopor, Mandrax; "Quaaludes")
 phenibut
 propofol (Diprivan), a general anesthetic
 theanine (found in Camellia sinensis, the tea plant)
 valerian (from Valeriana officinalis)

Stimulants

Stimulants, also known as "psychostimulants", induce euphoria with improvements in mental and physical function, such as enhanced alertness, wakefulness, and locomotion. Stimulants are also occasionally called "uppers". Depressants or "downers", which decrease mental or physical function, are in stark contrast to stimulants and are considered to be their functional opposites.

Stimulants enhance the activity of the central and peripheral nervous systems. Common effects may include increased alertness, awareness, wakefulness, endurance, productivity, and motivation, arousal, locomotion, heart rate, and blood pressure, and a diminished desire for food and sleep.

Use of stimulants may cause the body to significantly reduce its production of endogenous compounds that fulfill similar functions. Once the effect of the ingested stimulant has worn off the user may feel depressed, lethargic, confused, and dysphoric. This is colloquially termed a "crash" and may promote reuse of the stimulant.

Amphetamines are a significant cause of drug-induced psychosis. Importantly, a 2019 meta-analysis found that 22% of people with amphetamine-induced psychosis transition to a later diagnosis of schizophrenia.

Examples of stimulants include:
 Sympathomimetics (catecholaminergics)—e.g. amphetamine, methamphetamine, cocaine, methylphenidate, ephedrine, pseudoephedrine
 Entactogens (serotonergics, primarily phenethylamines)—e.g. MDMA (which is also an amphetamine)
 Eugeroics, e.g. modafinil
 Others
 arecoline (found in Areca catechu)
 caffeine (found in Coffea spp.)
 nicotine (found in Nicotiana spp.)
 rauwolscine (found in Rauvolfia serpentina)
 yohimbine (Procomil; a tryptamine alkaloid found in Pausinystalia johimbe)

Euphoriants

Alcohol: "Euphoria, the feeling of well-being, has been reported during the early (10–15 min) phase of alcohol consumption" (e.g., beer, wine or spirits)
Cannabis: Tetrahydrocannabinol, the main psychoactive ingredient in this plant, can have sedative and euphoric properties.
Catnip: Catnip contains a sedative known as nepetalactone that activates opioid receptors. In cats it elicits sniffing, licking, chewing, head shaking, rolling, and rubbing which are indicators of pleasure. In humans, however, catnip does not act as a euphoriant.
Stimulants: "Psychomotor stimulants produce locomotor activity (the subject becomes hyperactive), euphoria, (often expressed by excessive talking and garrulous behaviour), and anorexia. The amphetamines are the best known drugs in this category..."
MDMA: The "euphoriant drugs such as MDMA ('ecstasy') and MDEA ('eve')" are popular among young adults. MDMA "users experience short-term feelings of euphoria, rushes of energy and increased tactility" as well as interpersonal connectedness.
Opium: This "drug derived from the unripe seed-pods of the opium poppy…produces drowsiness and euphoria and reduces pain. Morphine and codeine are opium derivatives." Opioids have led to many deaths in the United States, particularly by causing respiratory depression.

Hallucinogens

Hallucinogens can be divided into three broad categories: psychedelics, dissociatives, and deliriants. They can cause subjective changes in perception, thought, emotion and consciousness. Unlike other psychoactive drugs such as stimulants and opioids, hallucinogens do not merely amplify familiar states of mind but also induce experiences that differ from those of ordinary consciousness, often compared to non-ordinary forms of consciousness such as trance, meditation, conversion experiences, and dreams.

Psychedelics, dissociatives, and deliriants have a long worldwide history of use within medicinal and religious traditions. They are used in shamanic forms of ritual healing and divination, in initiation rites, and in the religious rituals of syncretistic movements such as União do Vegetal, Santo Daime, Temple of the True Inner Light, and the Native American Church. When used in religious practice, psychedelic drugs, as well as other substances like tobacco, are referred to as entheogens.

Hallucinogen-induced psychosis occurs when psychosis persists despite no longer being intoxicated with the drug. It is estimated that 26% of people with hallucinogen-induced psychosis will transition to a diagnosis of schizophrenia. This percentage is less than the psychosis transition rate for cannabis (34%) but higher than that of amphetamines (22%).

Starting in the mid-20th century, psychedelic drugs have been the object of extensive attention in the Western world. They have been and are being explored as potential therapeutic agents in treating depression, post-traumatic stress disorder, obsessive-compulsive disorder, alcoholism, and opioid addiction. Yet the most popular, and at the same time most stigmatized, use of psychedelics in Western culture has been associated with the search for direct religious experience, enhanced creativity, personal development, and "mind expansion". The use of psychedelic drugs was a major element of the 1960s counterculture, where it became associated with various social movements and a general atmosphere of rebellion and strife between generations.
 Deliriants
 atropine (alkaloid found in plants of the family Solanaceae, including datura, deadly nightshade, henbane and mandrake)
 dimenhydrinate (Dramamine, an antihistamine)
 diphenhydramine (Benadryl, Unisom, Nytol)
 hyoscyamine (alkaloid also found in the Solanaceae)
 hyoscine hydrobromide (another Solanaceae alkaloid)
 myristicin (found in Myristica fragrans ("Nutmeg"))
 ibotenic acid (found in Amanita muscaria ("Fly Agaric"); prodrug to muscimol)
 muscimol (also found in Amanita muscaria, a GABAergic)
 Dissociatives
 dextromethorphan (DXM; Robitussin, Delsym, etc.; "Dex", "Robo", "Cough Syrup", "DXM")
 "Triple C's, Coricidin, Skittles" refer to a potentially fatal formulation containing both dextromethorphan and chlorpheniramine.
 ketamine (K; Ketalar, Ketaset, Ketanest; "Ket", "Kit Kat", "Special-K", "Vitamin K", "Jet Fuel", "Horse Tranquilizer")
 methoxetamine (Mex, Mket, Mexi)
 phencyclidine (PCP; Sernyl; "Angel Dust", "Rocket Fuel", "Sherm", "Killer Weed", "Super Grass")
 nitrous oxide (N2O; "NOS", "Laughing Gas", "Whippets", "Balloons")
 Psychedelics
 Phenethylamines
 2C-B ("Nexus", "Venus", "Eros", "Bees")
 2C-E ("Eternity", "Hummingbird")
 2C-I ("Infinity")
 2C-T-2 ("Rosy")
 2C-T-7 ("Blue Mystic", "Lucky 7")
 DOB
 DOC
 DOI
 DOM ("Serenity, Tranquility, and Peace" ("STP"))
 MDMA ("Ecstasy", "E", "Molly", "Mandy", "MD", "Crystal Love")
 mescaline (found in peyote, Peruvian torch cactus and San Pedro cactus)
 Tryptamines (including ergolines and lysergamides)
 5-MeO-DiPT ("Foxy", "Foxy Methoxy")
 5-MeO-DMT (found in various plants like chacruna, jurema, vilca, and yopo)
 alpha-methyltryptamine (αMT; Indopan; "Spirals")
 bufotenin (secreted by Bufo alvarius, also found in various Amanita mushrooms)
 N,N-dimethyltryptamine (N,N-DMT; DMT; "Dimitri", "Disneyland", "Spice"; found in large amounts in Psychotria and in D. cabrerana)
 lysergic acid amide (LSA; ergine; found in morning glory and Hawaiian baby woodrose seeds)
 lysergic acid diethylamide (LSD; L; Delysid; "Acid", "Sid". "Cid", "Lucy", "Sidney", "Blotters", "Droppers", "Sugar Cubes")
O-Acetylpsilocin (believed to be a prodrug of psilocin)
 psilocin (found in psilocybin mushrooms)
 psilocybin (also found in psilocybin mushrooms; prodrug to psilocin)
 ibogaine (found in Tabernanthe iboga ("Iboga"))
 Atypicals
 salvinorin A (found in Salvia divinorum, a trans-neoclerodane diterpenoid ("Diviner's Sage", "Lady Salvia", "Salvinorin"))
 tetrahydrocannabinol (found in cannabis)

Inhalants

Inhalants are gases, aerosols, or solvents that are breathed in and absorbed through the lungs. While some "inhalant" drugs are used for medical purposes, as in the case of nitrous oxide, a dental anesthetic, inhalants are used as recreational drugs for their intoxicating effect. Most inhalant drugs that are used non-medically are ingredients in household or industrial chemical products that are not intended to be concentrated and inhaled, including organic solvents (found in cleaning products, fast-drying glues, and nail polish removers), fuels (gasoline (petrol) and kerosene), and propellant gases such as Freon and compressed hydrofluorocarbons that are used in aerosol cans such as hairspray, whipped cream, and non-stick cooking spray. A small number of recreational inhalant drugs are pharmaceutical products that are used illicitly, such as anesthetics (ether and nitrous oxide) and volatile anti-angina drugs (alkyl nitrites, more commonly known as "poppers").

The most serious inhalant abuse occurs among children and teens who "[...] live on the streets completely without family ties". Inhalant users inhale vapor or aerosol propellant gases using plastic bags held over the mouth or by breathing from a solvent-soaked rag or an open container. The effects of inhalants range from an alcohol-like intoxication and intense euphoria to vivid hallucinations, depending on the substance and the dosage. Some inhalant users are injured due to the harmful effects of the solvents or gases, or due to other chemicals used in the products inhaled. As with any recreational drug, users can be injured due to dangerous behavior while they are intoxicated, such as driving under the influence. Computer cleaning dusters are dangerous to inhale, because the gases expand and cool rapidly upon being sprayed. In many cases, users have died from hypoxia (lack of oxygen), pneumonia, cardiac failure or arrest, or aspiration of vomit.

Examples include:
 Chloroform
 Ethyl chloride
 Diethyl ether
 Ethane and ethylene
 Laughing gas (nitrous oxide)
 Poppers (alkyl nitrites)
 Solvents and propellants (including propane, butane, freon, gasoline, kerosene, toluene) along with the fumes of glues containing them

List of drugs which can be smoked

Plants:
 tobacco
 cannabis
 salvia divinorum
 opium
 datura and other Solanaceae (formerly smoked to treat asthma)
 possibly other plants (see the section below)

Substances (also not necessarily psychoactive plants smoked within them):
 methamphetamine
 crack cocaine
 black tar heroin
 phencyclidine (PCP)
 synthetic cannabinoids (see also: synthetic cannabis)
 dimethyltryptamine (DMT)
 5-MeO-DMT
 Bufotenine
 DiPT
 Methaqualone
 Ethanol (alcohol)
 Ketamine
 Heroin
 many others, including some prescription drugs

List of psychoactive plants, fungi, and animals

Minimally psychoactive plants which contain mainly caffeine and theobromine:
 coffee
 tea (caffeine in tea is sometimes called theine) – also contains theanine
 guarana (caffeine in guarana is sometimes called guaranine)
 yerba mate (caffeine in yerba mate is sometimes called mateine)
 cocoa
 kola

Most known psychoactive plants:
 cannabis: cannabinoids
 tobacco: nicotine and beta-carboline alkaloids
 coca: cocaine
 opium poppy: morphine, codeine, and other opiates
 salvia divinorum: salvinorin A
 khat: cathine and cathinone
 kava: kavalactones
 nutmeg: myristicin and elemicin

Solanaceae plants—contain atropine, hyoscyamine, and scopolamine:
 datura
 deadly nightshade Atropa belladonna
 henbane
 mandrake (mandragora)
 other Solanaceae

Cacti with mescaline:
 Peyote
 Peruvian torch cactus
 San Pedro cactus

Other plants:
 kratom: mitragynine, mitraphylline, 7-hydroxymitragynine, raubasine, and corynanthine
 ephedra: ephedrine
 damiana
 Calea zacatechichi
 Silene capensis
 valerian: valerian (the chemical with the same name)
 various plants like chacruna, jurema, vilca, and yopo – 5-MeO-DMT
 Morning glory and Hawaiian Baby Woodrose – lysergic acid amide (LSA, ergine)
 Ayahuasca (for DMT)
 Tabernanthe iboga ("Iboga")—ibogaine
 Areca catechu (see: betel and paan)—arecoline
 Rauvolfia serpentina: rauwolscine
 yohimbe (Pausinystalia johimbe): yohimbine and corynanthine
 many others

Fungi:
 psilocybin mushrooms: psilocybin and psilocin
 various Amanita mushrooms: muscimol
 Amanita muscaria: ibotenic acid and muscimol
 Claviceps purpurea and other Clavicipitaceae: ergotamine (not psychoactive itself but used in synthesis of LSD)

Psychoactive animals:
 hallucinogenic fish
 psychoactive toads: Bufo alvarius (Colorado River toad or Sonoran Desert toad) contains bufotenin (5-MeO-DMT)

See also 

 Alcohol licensing laws of the United Kingdom
 Ban on caffeinated alcoholic drinks in the United States
 Cigarette packets in Australia
 Counterfeit medications
 Demand reduction
 Designer drug
 Drug policy
 Drug checking
 Drug education
 Drug liberalization
 Prohibition of drugs
 Effective dose
 Effects of cannabis
 Flavored tobacco
 Gateway drug effect
 Harm reduction
 Illegal drug trade
 Median lethal dose
 Legalization of non-medical cannabis in the United States
 Over the counter drug
 Pharmacology
 Polysubstance use and abuse
 Prevalence of tobacco use
 Project MKUltra
 Psychedelic experience
 Psychopharmacology
 Psychotomimetism
 Purple drank
 Recreational use of dextromethorphan
 Recreational use of ketamine
 Regulation of therapeutic goods
 Supply reduction
 Tobacco marketing targeting African Americans
 Tobacco packaging warning messages
 Usage of electronic cigarettes

Drug-related literature 
 Licit and Illicit Drugs
 Marihuana: The First Twelve Thousand Years
 Methland
 Smoke and Mirrors: The War on Drugs and the Politics of Failure
 The Doors of Perception
 This Is Your Country On Drugs

References

Further reading

External links 

 
 
 

Drug culture
History of drug control
Psychoactive drugs